Debauchery may refer to:

Corruption
Libertinism
Lust
Binge drinking
 Currency debasement
Debauchery (band), a German death metal band

See also
Sodom, or the Quintessence of Debauchery, a 1684 closet drama.
LGBT rights in Kuwait, which are influenced by "debauchery" law.
Campaign Against Lebanese Rape Law – Article 522, which successfully achieved to amend different laws in the Penal Code, some including debauchery.